The Gardiner River is a river in Cochrane District in northeastern Ontario, Canada. It is in the James Bay drainage basin, and is a left tributary of the Mattagami River. The river lies between the Mattagami and the Missinaibi River just upstream of the confluence of those two to form the Moose River, which flows to James Bay.

The river begins at the confluence of two unnamed streams in geographic Lambert Township and flows northeast through unplatted Cochrane District, then geographic Gentles Township to reach geographic McCuaig Township. It turns east, flows through geographic Mulholland Township, then into geographic Gardiner Township and reaches its mouth at the Mattagami River.

References

Other map sources:

Rivers of Cochrane District